Erik Scott de Bie (born July 18, 1983) is an American fantasy author and technical writer who has authored several Forgotten Realms novels. He has a degree in English composition and literature from Willamette University in Oregon.

Bibliography

Novel series

Forgotten Realms series
These titles are in the Forgotten Realms universe published through Wizards of the Coast.
Ghostwalker (2005, Wizards of the Coast)
Depths of Madness (2007, Wizards of the Coast)
Downshadow (2009, Wizards of the Coast)
Shadowbane (2011, Wizards of the Coast)
Shadowbane: Eye of Justice (2012, Wizards of the Coast)

Hellmaw series
Blind Justice (2015, Hellmaw)

The World of Ruin
Shadow of the Winter King (2014, Dragon Moon Press)
Shield of the Summer Prince (2015, Dragon Moon Press)

Standalone novels
Scourge of the Realm (2014, Broken Eye Books)

Anthologies
These are anthologies edited by de Bie.
Cobalt City Double Feature with Minerva Zimmerman (2012, Timid Pirate Publishing)

Short works
"The Hunting Game" in Realms of the Dragons II: The Year of Rogue Dragons (2005, Wizards of the Coast)
"Greater Treasure" in Realms of the Elves (2006, Wizards of the Coast)
"A Body in a Bag" in Realms of the Dead (2010, Wizards of the Coast)
"Racing Lights" in Close Encounters of the Urban Kind edited by Jennifer Brozek (2010, Apex Publications)
"Vengeance on the Layover" in Cobalt City Timeslip (2010, Timid Pirate Publishing)
"Carnival Heart" with Nathan Crowder, Rosemary Jones, Dawn Vogel, and Jeremy Zimmerman in Cobalt City: Dark Carnival (2011, Timid Pirate Publishing)
"Desperate Housewolves" in Beast Within 2: Predator & Prey edited by Jennifer Brozek (2011, Graveside Tales)
"Doctor Circe and the Separatist Man-Cheetahs" in Growing Dread: Biopunk Visions edited by Caroline Dombrowski (2011, Timid Pirate Publishing)
"The Frigate Lieutenant's Woman" in Space Tramps edited by Jennifer Brozek (2011, Flying Pen Press)
"Funhouse" in Cobalt City: Dark Carnival (2011, Timid Pirate Publishing)
"Ten Thousand Cold Nights" in Human for a Day edited by Martin H. Greenberg and Jennifer Brozek (2011, DAW Books)
"Witch Fire" in Beauty Has Her Way edited by Jennifer Brozek (2011, Dark Quest Books)
"Eye for an Eye" in Cobalt City Double Feature (2012, Timid Pirate Publishing)
"Hunger of the Blood Reaver" in When the Villain Comes Home edited by Ed Greenwood and  Gabrielle Harbowy (2012, Dragon Moon Press)
"Curse of the Bambino" in This Mutant Life: Bad Company edited by Ben Langdon (2013, Kalamity Press)
"Incubus Nickel" in Coins of Chaos edited by Jennifer Brozek (2013, Edge Science Fiction and Fantasy)
"Judgment" in Called to Battle Volume One (2013, Privateer Press)
"Before Death, Retribution" in Iron Kingdoms Excursions Season One Volume Six (2014, Privateer Press)
"Dr. Circe and the Shadow over Swedish Innsmouth" in That Ain't Right: Historical Accounts of the Miskatonic Valley edited by Dawn Vogel and Jeremy Zimmerman (2014, DefConOne Publishing)
"Shell Shock" in Iron Kingdoms Excursions Season Two Volume Three (2015, Privateer Press)
"King's Shield" in Women in Practical Armor (2016, Evil Girlfriend Media)

References

External links

1983 births
21st-century American male writers
21st-century American novelists
American fantasy writers
American male novelists
Living people
Willamette University alumni